Federico Coullaut-Valera Mendigutia (1912–1989) was a Spanish sculptor.  The son of sculptor Lorenzo Coullaut-Valera, he was born in Madrid.

He continued the work begun by his father in the Plaza de España.  Coullaut-Valera Mendigutia finished the monument in this square between 1956 and 1957.

A statue of Charles III of Spain by Coullaut-Valera stands in Olvera Street, Los Angeles.  It was presented in 1976 and dedicated by Juan Carlos I of Spain and Sofia of Spain in 1987.  Charles had ordered the founding of the town that became Los Angeles.

Works 
 Victoria Alada, Edificio Metrópolis, Madrid (1977)

References

External links
 Federico Coullaut-Valera

1989 deaths
1912 births
20th-century Spanish sculptors
20th-century Spanish male artists
Spanish male sculptors